"All Tangled Up in Love" is a song recorded by American country music artists Gus Hardin and Earl Thomas Conley. It was released in October 1984 as the first single from Hardin's album Wall of Tears. The song peaked at number 8 on the Billboard Hot Country Singles chart.  The song was written by Bob McDill and Jim Weatherly.

Chart performance

References

1984 singles
Gus Hardin songs
Earl Thomas Conley songs
RCA Records singles
Songs written by Bob McDill
Songs written by Jim Weatherly
Male–female vocal duets
Song recordings produced by Mark Wright (record producer)
1984 songs